Louis Sams (26 August 1863 – 6 July 1941) was an Australian cricketer. He played four first-class matches for Tasmania between 1883 and 1884.

See also
 List of Tasmanian representative cricketers

References

External links
 

1863 births
1941 deaths
Australian cricketers
Tasmania cricketers
Cricketers from Tasmania
People from Westbury, Tasmania